Palm Towers is two 58-storey office building on the Majlis Al Taawon Street, West Bay Doha, Qatar. The building is 245.07 meters high and has 58 floors. It was begun in 2006 and completed in 2011.

References 

Doha
Skyscrapers in Doha
Skyscraper office buildings
Office buildings completed in 2011